OFK Metacolor Ludanice is a Slovak football team, based in the village of Ludanice. The club was founded in 1935.

Current squad

References

External links 
Unofficial website 

Ludanice
Association football clubs established in 1935
1935 establishments in Slovakia